The Great Mandarin is a 1949 West German comedy drama film directed by Karl-Heinz Stroux and starring Paul Wegener, Carsta Löck, and Käthe Haack. It was the final film of the veteran actor Wegener.

Cast

References

Bibliography

External links 
 

1949 films
1949 comedy-drama films
German comedy-drama films
West German films
1940s German-language films
Films directed by Karl-Heinz Stroux
Films set in China
Bavaria Film films
German black-and-white films
1940s German films